Dispatch Packet (or Dispatch) was launched in France in 1807, probably under another name. She was taken in prize and from 1808 sailed from Falmouth, Cornwall, as a packet for the Post Office Packet Service. She sailed primarily to the Iberian peninsula, but also made voyages to North America, Suriname, and the Mediterranean. She was wrecked on 14 April 1812 while returning to Falmouth from Malta.

The following information is from Howat.

Fate
Dispatch was wrecked on a shoal between Malta and Mazara del Vallo, Trapani. All on board and the mails were rescued.

Captain Kirkness returned to England aboard the store ship .

Citations and references
Citations

References
 

1807 ships
Ships built in France
Captured ships
Age of Sail merchant ships of England
Falmouth Packets
Maritime incidents in 1812